Kára Djurhuus (born 16 January 1997) is a Faroese footballer who plays as a midfielder for HB and the Faroe Islands women's national team.

Club career
Djurhuus has played for EB/Streymur, EBS/Skála, HB in the Faroe Islands and for Pomigliano in Italy.

International career
Djurhuus made her senior debut for the Faroe Islands on 18 September 2020. She capped during the UEFA Women's Euro 2022 qualifying.

References

External links

1997 births
Living people
Faroese women's footballers
Women's association football midfielders
Faroe Islands women's youth international footballers
Faroe Islands women's international footballers
Havnar Bóltfelag players
Faroese expatriate footballers
Faroese expatriates in Italy
Expatriate women's footballers in Italy
Pomigliano C.F. players